Qareh Jalu (also Romanized as Qareh Jalū; also known as Qarājalū) is a village in Nazlu-e Shomali Rural District, Nazlu District, Urmia County, West Azerbaijan Province, Iran. At the 2006 census, its population was 108, in 29 families.

References 

Populated places in Urmia County